Merab is a Georgian masculine given name, and may refer to:

 Merab Dvalishvili (born 1991), Georgian UFC fighter 
 Merab Kostava (1939-1989), Georgian dissident, musician and poet
 Merab Kvirikashvili (born 1983), Georgian rugby union footballer
 Merab Mamardashvili (1930-1990), Georgian philosopher
 Merab Ninidze (born 1965), Georgian actor

See also 
 Paul Merab (1876–1930), a Georgian physician, pharmacist and researcher of Ethiopia
 Merav

Georgian masculine given names